Slim's Shout is an album by blues musician Sunnyland Slim recorded in 1960 and released on the Bluesville label the following year.

Reception

AllMusic reviewer Bill Dahl stated: "You wouldn't think that transporting one of Chicago's reigning piano patriarchs to Englewood Cliffs, NJ would produce such a fine album, but this 1960 set cooks from beginning to end. Sunnyland Slim's swinging New York rhythm section has no trouble following his bedrock piano, and the estimable King Curtis peels off diamond-hard tenor sax solos in the great Texas tradition that also mesh seamlessly".

Track listing
All compositions by Sunnyland Slim except where noted
 "I'm Prison Bound" (Brownie McGhee) – 3:19
 "Slim's Shout" (Sunnyland Slim, Ozzie Cadena) – 3:46
 "The Devil Is a Busy Man" – 3:49
 "Brownskin Woman" – 3:41
 "Shake It" (Big Joe Turner) – 3:00
 "Decoration Day" – 4:35
 "Baby How Long" (McGhee) – 2:40
 "Sunnyland Special" – 4:39
 "Harlem Can't Be Heaven" – 2:15
 "It's You Baby" – 2:23
 "Everytime I Get to Drinking" [take 3] – 2:40 Additional track on CD reissue
 "Tired of You Clowning" – 3:09 Additional track on CD reissue

Personnel

Performance
Sunnyland Slim – piano, vocals
King Curtis – tenor saxophone
Robert Banks – organ
Leonard Gaskin – bass
Belton Evans – drums

Production
Ozzie Cadena – supervision
Rudy Van Gelder – engineer

References

Sunnyland Slim albums
1961 albums
Bluesville Records albums
Albums recorded at Van Gelder Studio
Albums produced by Ozzie Cadena